The Arctic Midnight Orienteering or the AMO is an annual orienteering event usually held in the last week of June at Ilulissat.

32° magnetic course.

Midnight sun, open scenery, ocean, bay, islands and a lot of icebergs.

Clean fresh air, 5-15 °C and a mean monthly rainfall of 30 mm.

The race is organized by Ilulissat Orienteering Greenland (IOG) and has been run every year since 1999.

See also
 Orienteering
 Sprint (running)
 O-Ringen
 Saunders Lakeland Mountain Marathon

References

External links

Orienteering competitions
Sports competitions in Greenland
Events in Greenland
June sporting events
1999 establishments in Greenland
Recurring sporting events established in 1999
Summer events in Greenland